Wohlfahrtia villeneuvi is a species of flesh fly in the family Sarcophagidae.

Range
Egypt, Iran, Libya, Turkmenistan, Chad, Mauritania.

References

Sarcophagidae
Insects described in 1938